The Automobile Manufacturers Association was a trade group of automobile manufacturers that operated under various names in the United States from 1911 to 1999.  It was replaced by the Alliance of Automobile Manufacturers.

Early names 
A different group called the Automobile Manufacturers' Association was active in the very early 1900s, but then dissolved.  Another early group was the Association of Licensed Automobile Manufacturers, formed in 1903 and which was involved in licensing and collecting royalties from the George Baldwin Selden engine patent.  Henry Ford effectively defeated the patent in court in 1911 and the Association of Licensed Automobile Manufacturers dissolved.

However, the same manufacturers regrouped later in 1911 and formed the Automobile Board of Trade.  In 1913, this became the National Automobile Chamber of Commerce.

In 1934, this group renamed itself to the Automobile Manufacturers Association.  This was the name the group had the longest and became the best known by.  It focused upon establishing a code for fair competition.  In 1939, it moved its headquarters from New York City, where it had been close to bankers, to Detroit, where the manufacturers were all based.  The organization had a budget of $1 million at the time.

Activities 
During the early stages of World War II, the association played a role in adapting American automotive manufacturing capabilities towards arms production efforts, especially regarding large aircraft engines.  Within hours of the December 7, 1941 attack on Pearl Harbor, the association invited all companies in the larger automotive industry, regardless of whether they were association members, to join a new cooperative undertaking, the Automotive Council for War Production.  Some 654 manufacturing companies joined, and produced nearly $29 billion in output, including tremendous numbers of motorized vehicles, tanks, engines, and other products for the Allied military forces.  Between a fifth and a quarter of all U.S. wartime production was accounted for by the automotive industry.  In 1950, the association published the book, Freedom's Arsenal: The Story of the Automotive Council for War Production, to document this achievement.

They promoted the use of the word accident to describe car wrecks, as a way to make vehicle-related deaths and injuries seem like an unavoidable matter of fate, rather than a problem that could be addressed.  The automobile industry accomplished this by writing customized articles as a free service for newspapers, using the industry's preferred language.

Following the 1955 Le Mans disaster and the 1957 NASCAR Mercury Meteor crashes into the grandstands, the Automobile Manufacturers Association placed a ban on factory-supported racing. As a result, the automotive industry essentially disappeared from the  National Association for Stock Car Auto Racing (NASCAR).  The ban began to end in 1962 when Henry Ford II announced that the Ford Motor Company would again begin participating openly in NASCAR.

Foreign-owned automakers 
In August 1972, the group changed its name to the Motor Vehicle Manufacturers Association, to reflect the growing importance of truck makers.  A major issue then developed over whether foreign-owned automakers with operations and in some cases manufacturing within the U.S. could join the group.  In 1986 the association ruled that foreign transplants had to manufacture half their American sales within the country in order to join; a grandfather clause allowed Honda and Volvo to stay in.  In May 1988, Toyota's attempt to join was rejected on this line.  By 1992, Toyota and Nissan were able to meet the membership mark and qualify to join.

In late 1992, the group expelled Honda, Volvo, and heavy truck makers and changed its name to the American Automobile Manufacturers Association.  The association now was back to its traditional stance of representing the "Big Three" manufacturers.  They also moved their headquarters from Detroit to Washington, D.C., in order to have a stronger governmental presence.

However, their situation became problematic with the DaimlerChrysler merger of 1998, which meant there were only two American-only manufacturers, too few for an organization.  The American Automobile Manufacturers Association was thus phased out in January 1999, and a new and different successor group, the Alliance of Automobile Manufacturers, was formed and included many foreign-owned manufacturers.

See also
 American Automotive Policy Council
 Association of Global Automakers

References

Automobile associations in the United States
Organizations established in 1911
Organizations disestablished in 1999